Kobra may refer to:

Places
 Maharashtrian Konkanastha Brahmins, community in western state of Maharashtra in India (abbreviated KoBra)
 Kobra, Estonia, village in Vändra Parish, Pärnu County, Estonia

Comics, games and amusements
 Kobra (Mortal Kombat), a character from the Mortal Kombat series of fighting games
 Kobra (DC Comics), a 1976 villain in the DC Comics universe
 Kobra (comic book), the title and main character of a Yugoslav comic book
 Kobra Khan, a character from the Masters of the Universe franchise
 Kobra (ride), a Zamperla flat ride based in Chessington World Of Adventures, a theme park in London

People 	
 Kobra (born 2006), American Youtuber who releases Minecraft content
 Eduardo Kobra (born 1976), Brazilian graffiti artist known as Kobra
 Kobra Paige (born 1988), lead vocalist for Canadian heavy metal band Kobra and the Lotus

Military
 9K112 Kobra, an anti-tank missile system of the Soviet Union
 Otokar Cobra, a Turkish infantry mobility vehicle

Television
 Kobra (TV programme), a 2001 Swedish culture television programme

Software
 KobrA method, as used in Reuters 3000 Xtra; a design process that is supported through a standard approach to constructing software

See also
 Cobra (disambiguation)